Fabrizio Ronechetti (born 26 June 1985 in Uruguay) is a Uruguayan footballer who now plays for A.D. Carmelita in Costa Rica.

Career
Ronchetti started his senior career with Juventud de Las Piedras. In 2013, he signed for Club Sportivo Cerrito in the Uruguayan Segunda División, where he made five league appearances and scored one goal. After that, A.D. Municipal Pérez Zeledón, C.S. Cartaginés, Deportivo Saprissa, A.D. San Carlos, Santos de Guápiles, and A.D. Carmelita, where he now plays.

References 

1985 births
Living people
Uruguayan footballers
Association football forwards
Juventud de Las Piedras players
La Luz F.C. players
Universidad de Las Palmas CF footballers
Club Plaza Colonia de Deportes players
Club Sportivo Cerrito players
C.D. Suchitepéquez players
Municipal Pérez Zeledón footballers
C.S. Cartaginés players
Deportivo Saprissa players
A.D. San Carlos footballers
Santos de Guápiles footballers
A.D. Carmelita footballers
Uruguayan Segunda División players
Segunda División B players
Liga Nacional de Fútbol de Guatemala players
Liga FPD players
Uruguayan expatriate footballers
Uruguayan expatriate sportspeople in Italy
Uruguayan expatriate sportspeople in Spain
Uruguayan expatriate sportspeople in Costa Rica
Uruguayan expatriate sportspeople in Guatemala
Expatriate footballers in Italy
Expatriate footballers in Spain
Expatriate footballers in Costa Rica
Expatriate footballers in Guatemala